Juraj Slafkovský (born 30 March 2004) is a Slovak professional ice hockey forward for the Montreal Canadiens of the National Hockey League (NHL). He was selected first overall in the 2022 NHL Entry Draft by the Canadiens, the highest-drafted Slovak player in the history of the NHL.

Slafkovský first rose to prominence as a member of the Slovak national team at the 2022 Winter Olympics, where he played a pivotal role in Slovakia's first-ever Olympic medal in ice hockey. Leading the tournament in scoring, he was named its most valuable player. He was identified as part of a new generation of promising Slovak hockey players.

Playing career

Liiga
Slafkovský first left home at the age of 14 to train at Red Bull's ice hockey academy in Austria. After months spent there and in the Czech Republic competing against older teenagers, he moved to Finland's HC TPS, seeking a higher class of competition. Slafkovský played three seasons with TPS's team in the Finnish junior league, before making his debut in the Liiga for the 2021–22 season. His debut in the senior men's ranks was initially inauspicious, recording only one goal in his first 20 games. After returning from his star turn at the 2022 Winter Olympics, Slafkovský's play improved noticeably, and he finished the regular season with five goals and five assists. He went on to record two goals and five assists in 18 playoff games. TPS advanced to the Finals, but lost to Tappara in five games.

National Hockey League

2022 NHL Entry Draft
Slafkovský was eligible for the 2022 NHL Entry Draft, and by the mid-season assessment was being cited as a potential top five selection, in particular on the strength of his international performances. The presumptive first overall pick at the beginning of the season, Shane Wright of the Ontario Hockey League's (OHL) Kingston Frontenacs, was judged by many as having "left the door open for someone to unseat him" after a subpar start. As the draft approached, Slafkovský had emerged as Wright's primary challenger, and topped a number of rankings by scouts and commentators. The first overall pick was won by the Montreal Canadiens, whose general manager, Kent Hughes, confirmed days before the draft that the choice was between Slafkovský, Wright and Logan Cooley of the USNTDP.

On 7 July 2022, the Canadiens used the first overall pick to select Slafkovský. He became the highest-drafted Slovak player in the history of the NHL, surpassing Marián Gáborík, who was taken third overall in 2000. As well, with defenceman Šimon Nemec selected second overall by the New Jersey Devils, this was only the second time in history that a single European country had the top two selections in a single draft (after Russia in 2004). The Canadiens also selected Filip Mešár, another Slovak player and longtime friend of Slafkovský's, later in the first round. Six days after the draft, Slafkovský signed a three-year, entry-level contract with the Canadiens.

Montreal Canadiens (2022–present)
Upon arrival in Montreal he found that his preferred no. 20 jersey number, which he had used with the Slovak national team, was already in use by defenceman Chris Wideman. However, Wideman agreed to cede the number to Slafkovský in exchange for an autographed jersey as a keepsake for his newborn son. His performance in the pre-season games was a subject of considerable media interest, with Sportsnet saying he "at times appeared out of his element," but Hughes stated "we've seen the start of a process of adjusting from hockey in Europe to hockey in North America." The general manager indicated that Slafkovský would be given the opportunity to develop with the Canadiens, though there was a possibility of him spending time with the team's American Hockey League (AHL) affiliate Laval Rocket. On 10 October 2022, it was confirmed that he had made the Canadiens' opening night roster for the regular season. He appeared in his first NHL game on 12 October, a 4–3 victory over their traditional archrival the Toronto Maple Leafs. In his fifth game with the team on 20 October, Slafkovský scored his first goal in the NHL during a 6–2 rout of the Arizona Coyotes. After missing three games with an unspecified upper body injury, Slafkovský returned to the lineup on 29 October and was placed on the power play for the first time, where he scored his first power play goal (and second NHL goal) that same night against the St. Louis Blues. After boarding the Detroit Red Wings' forward Matt Luff in a 8 November game, he was suspended for two games by the NHL. After sustaining a knee injury in a 15 January 2023 game against the New York Rangers, the Canadiens announced that Slafkovský would be out for three months, likely bringing his season to an end.

International play

Debuting on the international scene in 2021, Slafkovský competed as part of Slovakia national team on both the under-20 and senior rosters, appearing at the 2021 World Junior Ice Hockey Championships and the 2021 IIHF World Championship. He then joined the under-18 team at the 2021 Hlinka Gretzky Cup, winning a silver medal.

Slafkovský was one of two 17-year-olds included on Slovakia national team for the 2022 Winter Olympics tournament, alongside Šimon Nemec, with Slafkovský being the youngest player in the tournament. He scored both of Slovakia's goals in the opening game against Finland, a 6–2 loss, becoming the first 17-year-old to score in men's Olympic ice hockey since Eddie Olczyk in 1984. Slafkovský finished the tournament as its top scorer with seven goals in seven games, leading Slovakia to a bronze medal, their first-ever Olympic medal in ice hockey. He was voted most valuable player of the tournament. He was later named to the national team for the 2022 IIHF World Championship, recording three goals and six assists in nine games. His performance at the World Championship was later said to have further enhanced his profile ahead of the NHL draft. In recognition of his international performances in 2022, the Slovak Ice Hockey Federation gave Slafkovský its Player of the Year award, as well as the honours as Best Forward and Best U20 Player. He was the youngest recipient of Slovakia's Player of the Year award.

Career statistics

Regular season and playoffs

International

Awards and honours

References

External links
 

2004 births
Living people
Expatriate ice hockey players in Austria
HC TPS players
Ice hockey players at the 2022 Winter Olympics
Medalists at the 2022 Winter Olympics
Montreal Canadiens draft picks
Montreal Canadiens players
National Hockey League first-overall draft picks
Olympic bronze medalists for Slovakia
Olympic ice hockey players of Slovakia
Olympic medalists in ice hockey
Slovak expatriate ice hockey players in Canada
Slovak expatriate ice hockey players in Finland
Slovak expatriate ice hockey players in the Czech Republic
Slovak expatriate sportspeople in Austria
Slovak ice hockey centres
Sportspeople from Košice